R.I.P.D., also marketed as R.I.P.D.: Rest in Peace Department, is a 2013 American supernatural action comedy film starring Jeff Bridges and Ryan Reynolds. The film was directed by Robert Schwentke and written by Phil Hay and Matt Manfredi, based on the 1999 comic book R.I.P.D. by Peter M. Lenkov. The film also stars Kevin Bacon, Mary-Louise Parker, Stéphanie Szostak, and Marisa Miller. It received an MPAA film rating of PG-13.

Filming was completed on January 28, 2012, and the film was originally set to be released on June 28, 2013 in the United States by Universal Pictures, but was pushed back to July 19, 2013.

The film was a box-office bomb, grossing $78 million on a $130 million budget, and was met with negative reviews. A direct-to-DVD prequel, R.I.P.D. 2: Rise of the Damned, was released on November 15, 2022.

Plot
Boston Police detectives Nick Walker and Bobby Hayes steal gold during a drug bust. Nick regrets the theft and tells Hayes that he will turn it in as evidence. Hayes shoots and kills Nick at the next drug bust.  Time stops around Nick and he is drawn into a vortex, depositing him in an office.  Nick meets Mildred Proctor, who explains that he is dead and was headed to judgment.  She recruits him into the R.I.P.D., whose job is to find and capture Deados - the souls of people who died but escaped judgment.  Nick is partnered with Roicephus "Roy" Pulsipher, a lawman from the Old West.  Roy takes Nick to watch his own funeral and Nick talks to his wife Julia but she does not recognize him.  Roy explains that the R.I.P.D. officers have their appearance changed and are blocked from revealing their true identities.  Nick now appears as an elderly Asian man while Roy appears to be a beautiful blonde woman.

Roy takes Nick to question a suspected Deado named Stanley.  They ask Stanley questions until he "pops" and is exposed as a Deado.  Stanley tries to escape and throws up a bunch of gold he swallowed before being shot by Roy.  Roy and Nick argue and Nick throws Roy in front of a bus, causing Roy to lose his cowboy hat.  Nick and Roy return to headquarters and book the gold as evidence.  Nick wants to investigate the gold further and asks Roy to take him to an informant.  Roy takes Nick to meet a Deado named Elliot, who claims the gold is junk.  Nick leaves the gold with Elliot and watches as he gives it to Nick's old partner Hayes.  Roy and Nick tail Hayes to Nick's house and watch him dig up Nick's gold before following Hayes to the airport.  Hayes gives the gold to a Deado who gets stopped by Roy and Nick while leaving.  The Deado refuses to talk and instead pops himself, becoming a hulking monster.  It leads Nick and Roy on a public chase that ends with Nick getting the gold but the Deado escaping.  Nick and Roy return to headquarters and book the gold before being taken to Eternal Affairs to be punished for the Deado escaping.  They learn the gold is part of an artifact called the Staff of Jericho, which can reverse the tunnel to the afterlife. Nick and Roy are also suspended from duty pending a hearing.

Nick leaves and tries to reveal himself to Julia, but she runs away from him.  Roy and Nick argue again but make up after Nick apologizes.  They decide to track down the rest of the gold despite their suspensions.  They confront Hayes at home and he reveals he is a Deado.  They arrest him and seize the rest of the gold.  At headquarters, Hayes triggers a device that freezes R.I.P.D. officers while the Deados steal the gold back and escape.  The Deados block off the streets and begin assembling the Staff of Jericho on the roof of a building.  Nick and Roy fight their way to the building as Hayes fatally wounds Julia to use her blood to power the Staff.  The dead begin to rain down on Earth as Nick distracts Hayes and Roy destroys the Staff.  The vortex closes and Nick shoots Hayes in the head, erasing him.  Time stops around Julia as she dies and sees Nick's true self.  They share a passionate goodbye and Nick tells her to move on with her life without him.

Julia wakes up in the hospital where Proctor, who appears as a doctor, checks on her.  Proctor tells Nick that Julia will be fine and that he owes her a favor.  Proctor tells Nick and Roy that Eternal Affairs had their hearings without them.  Nick is given a warning while Roy has fifty-three more years added to his service.  Proctor takes Roy aside and returns his cowboy hat as they share a tender moment and make up.  Roy gives Nick a new identity and Nick is excited until he sees that he now appears as a Girl Scout with orthodontic headgear on.

Cast
 Ryan Reynolds as Nick Walker, a Boston Police detective who is murdered by his partner and recruited into the R.I.P.D.
 Jeff Bridges as Roicephus "Roy" Pulsipher, a self-described lawman in the Old West and veteran officer of the R.I.P.D.  Roy prefers to work alone and often runs afoul of Proctor, his supervisor and a former lover.  Roy was also killed by his partner and obsesses over how he died.
 Mary-Louise Parker as Mildred Proctor: Supervisor of the R.I.P.D. At some point in the past she was in a relationship with Roy, who seems to resent her promotion to Supervisor.
 Kevin Bacon as Bobby Hayes, a corrupt Boston Police detective and Nick's partner.  Hayes is secretly a Deado who was killed in a drug raid but escaped judgment.
 Stéphanie Szostak as Julia Walker, Nick's widow who is sacrificed by Hayes to power the Staff of Jericho.
 Marisa Miller as FBI Special Agent Opal Pavlenko, an FBI Agent and Roy's avatar.
 James Hong as Grandpa Jerry Chen, a retired Boston Police Department Captain from 1995 and Nick's first avatar.
 Devin Ratray as Pulaski, a Fat Businessman Deado who helps Hayes collect the gold for the Staff of Jericho.  As an exposed Deado he has the ability to defy gravity, running up the side of a building and jumping sideways to break a window.
 Robert Knepper as Stanley Nawicki, the first Deado Nick encounters as Roy's partner.  Stanley denies being a Deado before failing the card test and is erased after trying to escape.
 Mike O'Malley as Elliot, Fenway Park's scoreboard operator and a Deado.  Roy allows him to avoid judgment in exchange for his work as an informant.  He is erased during the final battle after helping Hayes.
 Larry Joe Campbell as Officer Murphy
 Piper Mackenzie Harris as Girl Scout, Nick's second avatar.
 Toby Huss, Mike Judge, and Jon Olson as Various Deado Voices

Zach Galifianakis was originally cast as Roy Pulsipher, but dropped out due to scheduling conflicts. Jodie Foster was originally considered for the role of Proctor, but in the end, Mary-Louise Parker was cast.

Production
In April 2006, following the success of Wedding Crashers, director David Dobkin was set to helm an in-development adaptation of the comic book R.I.P.D. for Universal, with Phil Hay and Matt Manfredi hired to write the screenplay.

In September 2010, Universal officially greenlit the film, with Robert Schwentke to direct with Ryan Reynolds in the lead role as David Dobkin had since dropped out. The following April, Jeff Bridges entered talks to star as the co-lead in the film following Zach Galifianakis turning down the role. In July of that year, Kevin Bacon was cast to play the villain, with Stephanie Szostak and Mary-Louise Parker rounding out the cast in August.

Music
The soundtrack to RIPD was released on July 16, 2013.

Release
The film was originally set to be released on July 19, 2013, but was pushed back to June 28, 2013, in the United States.

Marketing
On July 16, Adult Swim's YouTube channel uploaded an animated prequel short, which was produced by Titmouse, Inc. and featured the voice work of Reynolds and Bridges.

Video game
An Atlus published video game based on the film and titled R.I.P.D. The Game was released on July 16, 2013, for Microsoft Windows, PlayStation 3, and Xbox 360. The game is a co-op third-person shooter, set around a survival mode. It was developed by Old School Games and features gameplay similar to their previous game, God Mode. Like its film counterpart, R.I.P.D. The Game received mostly negative reviews.

Reception

Box office
The film grossed only $12.7 million in its opening weekend and ended its theatrical run with $78.3 million worldwide, including a $33.6 million domestic total and $44.7 million in other territories. According to Deadline.com, the budget was more than the $130 million the studio claimed, and was $154 million even after $28.1 million in tax rebates. The film is considered a box-office bomb.

Critical response
R.I.P.D. received generally negative reviews from critics. On Rotten Tomatoes the film has an approval rating of 12% based on 106 reviews with an average rating of 3.70/10. The site's critical consensus reads, "It has its moments — most of them courtesy of Jeff Bridges' rootin' tootin' performance as an undead Wild West sheriff — but R.I.P.D. is ultimately too dim-witted and formulaic to satisfy." On Metacritic, the film has a score of 25 out of 100 based on 27 critics, indicating "generally unfavorable reviews". Audiences polled by CinemaScore gave the film an average grade of "C+" on an A+ to F scale.

Film critic Roger Moore gave the film one-and-a-half out of four stars, calling it "the worst comic book adaptation since Jonah Hex." Kyle Smith of the New York Post gave the film a half-star out of four, writing: "For a movie that so strenuously rips off Ghostbusters and Men in Black, R.I.P.D. manages to come up with fresh new ways of being absolutely terrible. The plot manages to be fully predictable and freakishly bonkers at the same time, seemingly born of the same kind of brainstorming-on-L.S.D. session that must have given us Howard the Duck."

Prequel
In August 2022, it was announced that a prequel reboot film titled R.I.P.D. 2: Rise of the Damned had been filmed, produced by Universal Home Entertainment. The film was released directly to Blu-ray and DVD on November 15, 2022. Paste gave it a negative review.

On the review aggregator website, Rotten Tomatoes, the film has so far received four reviews. The audience approval rating sits at 26% from 100+ ratings.

References

External links
 
 
 
 

2013 films
American films with live action and animation
2013 3D films
2013 action comedy films
2013 fantasy films
2013 science fiction action films
2010s buddy comedy films
2010s buddy cop films
2010s police comedy films
2010s science fiction comedy films
2010s ghost films
American action comedy films
American supernatural films
American buddy action films
American buddy cop films
Fictional portrayals of the Boston Police Department
Films about death
Films about the afterlife
American films about revenge
Films based on Dark Horse Comics
Films directed by Robert Schwentke
Films produced by Neal H. Moritz
Films scored by Christophe Beck
Films set in Boston
Films shot in Massachusetts
Films shot in Rhode Island
Live-action films based on comics
Occult detective fiction
Paranormal films
Apocalyptic films
Films using motion capture
Science fantasy films
Dark Horse Entertainment films
Original Film films
Universal Pictures films
American fantasy films
American ghost films
Films with screenplays by Phil Hay (screenwriter)
Films with screenplays by Matt Manfredi
2010s English-language films
2010s American films